Rassias is a surname. Notable people with the surname and uses of the name include:

John Rassias (1925-2015), American language-teaching pioneer
Dartmouth College's Rassias Center for World Languages and Cultures which he founded
Themistocles M. Rassias (born 1951), Greek mathematician
Aleksandrov–Rassias problem
Cauchy–Rassias stability
Hyers–Ulam–Rassias stability
Vlassis G. Rassias (1959–2019), Greek writer and neopagan leader